The War of the Worlds: Next Century is a 1981 Polish film by Piotr Szulkin which is inspired by the classic 1897 novel of H. G. Wells, The War of the Worlds. It was immediately banned by the Polish government upon its release because it depicted political parallels with the political context of the country at that time. It did not receive its premiere until 20 February 1983.

Plot
The film starts from the position close to the literary inspiration suggested in the title, but rather  than developing it in the same manner as the novel, it is used as a witty commentary on the political situation of Poland in the period of the Polish People's Republic.

The film starts with the arrival of a more advanced civilization from Mars which purports to have a friendly attitude towards Earthlings. The place visited by the Martians resembles a police state in which a huge role is played by television, which is used as a propaganda tool.

The main character of the film, Iron Idem (Roman Wilhelmi) is a news presenter who has a popular TV program, Iron Idem's Independent News. However, the news that is presented on his program is carefully chosen by Idem's boss (Mariusz Dmochowski) who later orders the kidnapping of Idem's wife (Krystyna Janda). Iron Idem is forced to collaborate with the state apparatus, which is working together with blood-thirsty Martians, and encourages people to make sacrifices and give blood in the hope of having his wife and normal life returned.

After being thrown out of his flat, Idem has a chance to observe stupefied citizens who fall victim to the repression of the state apparatus. Finally, the main protagonist rebels and criticizes society during a TV Super Show which is a concert organized as a farewell to the Martians.

On the day after the Martians departure the Earth’s mass media change their perception of the whole situation and the visit from Mars is viewed as an aggressive invasion and Iron Idem is shown as the main collaborator. He agrees to collaborate with his mock trial in exchange for seeing his wife but she is delivered dead in the same bag her captors used to kidnap her. Finally he is sentenced to death and executed by firing squad where he only show as dead on the television screen in what appears to be an [afterlife] moment. He leaves the television studio and steps into an outside world obfuscated by light and mist.

Sources

External links

1981 films
Alien invasions in films
Films set in the 1890s
Polish science fiction films
1980s Polish-language films
Films based on The War of the Worlds
Films directed by Piotr Szulkin
1980s science fiction films
Obscenity controversies in film